The 1929 Tour of the Basque Country was the sixth edition of the Tour of the Basque Country cycle race and was held from 7 August to 11 August 1929. The race started in Bilbao and finished in Las Arenas. The race was won by Maurice De Waele.

General classification

References

1929
Bas